Shorkot–Lalamusa Branch Line is one of several branch lines in Pakistan, operated and maintained by Pakistan Railways. The line begins from Shorkot Cantonment Junction station and ends at Lalamusa Junction station. There are 42 railway stations from Shorkot Junction to Lalamusa Junction.

History

The Shorkot–Lalamusa Branch Line was originally constructed as a metre gauge railway from Lala Musa to Malakwal in 1881 and named the Sind–Sagar Railway. In 1886, the Sind–Sagar Railway was amalgamated with other railways in the region to form the North Western State Railway. During this time period, the railway line was converted to broad gauge.

Stations

References

Railway stations on Shorkot–Lalamusa Branch Line
5 ft 6 in gauge railways in Pakistan